A Cross the Universe is the first live album by the French electronic music duo Justice, released on 24 November 2008 on iTunes and on 9 December 2008 physically by Ed Banger Records, Because Music and Atlantic Records.

History and background
The album's title is a play on words of The Beatles song "Across the Universe" and the band's own album †. The live portion of this release was recorded at a concert in San Francisco, California at the Concourse Exhibition Center, on 27 March 2008. The CD also came with a DVD of the film of the same name called A Cross the Universe.

Track listing

CD

Charts

References

External links
 Justice on Myspace

Justice (band) albums
2008 live albums
2008 video albums
Live video albums